The men's freestyle 74 kilograms is a competition featured at the 2014 World Wrestling Championships, and was held in Tashkent, Uzbekistan on 9 September 2014.

This freestyle wrestling competition consists of a single-elimination tournament, with a repechage used to determine the winner of two bronze medals.

Results
Legend
D — Disqualified
F — Won by fall

Final

Top half

Bottom half

Repechage

References
Official website

Men's freestyle 74 kg